Athletic Park is a baseball stadium located in Wausau, Wisconsin. It is the home field of the Wausau Woodchucks baseball team of the summer collegiate Northwoods League. It hosted Wausau Minor League teams during 36 seasons between 1936-1990.

History
Athletic Park was built in 1936. It sits in a residential area, just north of downtown Wausau, with a stone wall around the perimeter. The park was the home of the Wausau Timbers of the Class-A Midwest League until 1990. Additions during the era included a roof in 1950, concessions in 1977, and clubhouses in 1981. It held seating for 3,850 people.

After the 1990 season, the Wausau Timbers moved to Geneva, Illinois and became the Kane County Cougars. The ballpark has hosted the Wausau Woodchucks of the summer collegiate Northwoods League beginning in 1994.

Athletic Park was the home of Wausau East, Wausau West, and Wausau Newman high school baseball teams during the 1990s.

Between the 2013 and 2014 seasons, the ballpark underwent major renovations. The grandstand was demolished and replaced with a handicapped accessible one, including an elevator to the three levels. The new stadium opened May 30, 2014 for the Woodchucks home opener, which they lost, 6-4. The renovations were estimated at $2.7 million. More took place in Phase II of 2015-2016 construction, with further improvements totaling $6.5 million.

Professional baseball
Professional baseball Wausau teams that have played at Athletic Park include: the Wausau Lumberjacks (1936-1942, 1946-1949, 1956–57), the Wausau Timberjacks (1950–1953), the Wausau Mets (1975-1978), and the Wausau Timbers (1979-1990). The teams were affiliated with the following major league franchises: the Cleveland Indians (1936 1937, 1942), the Philadelphia Phillies (1940–1941), the St. Louis Browns (1947–1949), the Detroit Tigers (1951–1953), the Cincinnati Reds (1956–1957), the New York Mets (1975-1978), Co-op (1979-1980), the Seattle Mariners (1981-1989), and the Baltimore Orioles (1990).

The Wausau teams were members of the following professional Minor Leagues: the Northern League (1936-1942, 1956–1957), the Wisconsin State League (1946-1953), and the Midwest League (1975-1990).

1981 Midwest League Championship
The 1981 the Wausau Timbers finished 84-48 and defeated the Quad City Cubs for the Midwest League Championship at Athletic Park. The team was managed by Bill Plummer and had future MLB players Ivan Calderon, Darnell Coles, Edwin Nunez, Jim Presley, and Harold Reynolds on the roster.

Notable players

 Neil Allen (1976)
 Juan Berenguer (1975)
 Ray Boone (1942) 2 x MLB AS; 1955 AL runs batted in leader
 Dave Bristol (1957) MLB manager
 Bob Bruce (1953)
 Damon Buford (1990)
 Ivan Calderon (1981–82) MLB AS
 Chuckie Carr (1988) 1993 NL stolen base leader
 Darnell Coles (1981)
 Daniel Descalso (2006)
 Ryne Duren (1949) 3 x MLB AS; 1958 AL saves leader
 Joe Gaines (1956)
 Wally Gilbert (1939-1942) 
 Jesse Gonder (1956)
 Edgar Martínez (1984) 7 x MLB AS; 2000 AL runs batted in leader; 2 x AL batting title (1992, 1995)
 Phil Masi (1937) 3 x MLB AS
 Bill Monbouquette (1976 MGR) 3 x MLB AS
 Pat Neshek (2000) MLB AS
 Edwin Nunez (1981) 
 Wes Obermueller (1996, 1998) 
 Vada Pinson (1956) GG; 2x MLB AS
 Bill Plummer (1981 MGR)
 Jim Presley (1981) MLB AS
 Harold Reynolds (1981)3 x GG; 2 x  MLB AS; 1987 AL stolen base leader
 Cookie Rojas (1957) 5 x MLB AS
 Mike Tresh (1952) MLB AS
 Alex Trevino (1977) 
 Omar Vizquel (1986) 10 x  GG; 3 x MLB AS
 Mookie Wilson (1977)
 Ned Yost (1975) manager Kansas City Royals, 2015 World Series champion
 Greg Zaun (1990) 16 MLB seasons
 Ben Zobrist (2003) 2 x MLB AS

References

External links
Wausau Woodchucks official website 
Athletic Park at ballparkreviews.com, Retrieved January 17, 2007

Baseball venues in Wisconsin
Minor league baseball venues
Sports in Wausau, Wisconsin
1936 establishments in Wisconsin
Defunct Midwest League ballparks